Jaime Lynn Long (born June 10, 1985) is an American singer and songwriter. He was a frequent collaborator with hip hop group Pretty Ricky, and also featured the group on his own song "Personal Freak". In April 2015, before departing from the music industry, Long toured one last time with his bandmates in Europe.

Early life 
Long was born into a family of musicians. His uncle, Huey Long (1904–2009), was an African-American jazz and R&B guitarist of the pop group The Ink Spots. By age 17, he was selling beats recorded on equipment his stepfather, Melvin Hudnall, bought him. As he developed as an artist, he cited musician D'Angelo as a heavy influence. Long has since earned credits for singing, songwriting, producing.

Career
Long signed his first record deal soon after graduating high school, joining NBA player Steve Francis's label ISOH Entertainment. In 2006, Long released his Six-10 mixtape through Mike Jones's Ice Age Entertainment label. His career began to take off with his 2008 single, "Berry Love".  Long released his debut album Girl Listen in 2009, whose single "Personal Freak" hit #4 on Billboard. Other songs by Long feature artists Lil' Webbie and Juvenile. At one point, Long took a break from music for spiritual reasons. When he returned to the recording world, Long began to write and produce inspirational  music, releasing an album entitled R & B (Redeemed and Blessed), featuring the single, "Jesus I Need You".

Long's solo record sales caught the attention of hip hop group Pretty Ricky, who were searching for a new singer to join the group. After signing with BlueStar Entertainment, Pretty Ricky did a remake of Long's highly successful Personal Freak. Long remained with the group from 2010 to 2012. During that time, he accompanied them on several tours, including BET's 106th & Park Tour. After he left the group in 2012, he later rejoined them on their European tour in April 2015.

Personal life 
In 2019, three years into their relationship, it was reported that Long married author and criminal justice advocate Cyntoia Brown. Wes Yoder, a representative for both Long and Brown, confirmed the marriage and stated that the details of how the two met could be found in Cyntoia Brown Long's memoir through Atria Books.

Long, along with his wife, founded a nonprofit organization together in the fall of 2019. The Foundation for Justice, Freedom, and Mercy or The JFAM Foundation, exists to amplify narratives relating to social and criminal justice in the hopes that it can empower individuals who are at risk of exploitation or criminal justice system involvement. In addition to his work in the charitable sector, Long is owner of a Texas healthcare company.

Brazilian Jiu Jitsu 
Following his music career, Long dedicated himself to training Jiu Jitsu. He has also competed in martial arts tournaments. On his social media pages, Long has posted photos and videos showing that he is actively involved in Brazilian Jiu Jitsu, earning his blue belt in November 2020. In August 2020, he was named the winner of the Good Fight Tournament Feather weight division, and finished in second place of the Tournament Lightweight division.

References 

1985 births
21st-century American male musicians
21st-century American musicians
American gospel musicians
Living people
American rhythm and blues musicians
21st-century African-American musicians
20th-century African-American people